William Sharpe (c. 1882–1960) was a brain surgeon who developed treatment for retardation and palsy in children.

In 1948, he donated 1,500 acres of land to The Fresh Air Fund. That donation became part of the Sharpe Reservation, a heavily wooded nature reserve in Fishkill, New York, which eventually expanded to 3,000 acres.

Sharpe, who wrote an autobiography at age 70, served as the first president of the Pan-American Medical Association. He died at age 77, having retired and moved to Florida with his wife.

He graduated from Harvard College and Harvard Medical School.

References

American surgeons
20th-century American physicians
1880s births
1960 deaths
Year of birth uncertain
Philanthropists from New York (state)
Harvard College alumni
Harvard Medical School alumni